TWA, Inc. v. Hardison is a landmark decision on religious liberty and employment law made in 1977 by the US Supreme Court, holding that an employer may discharge an employee who observes a seventh-day sabbath, and that such employee is not entitled to equal employment opportunity protection under Title VII of the Civil Rights Act of 1964, which makes it an unlawful employment practice for an employer to discriminate against an employee on the basis of his religion.

The Supreme Court agreed in 2023 to hear a case, Groff v. DeJoy, that challenges the legal precedent.

Case History
Larry Hardison was an employee at Trans World Airline. Hardison was a member of the Worldwide Church of God and refused to work on Saturdays which was his sabbath. TWA transferred his shift from night to during the day on Saturday. But he didn't keep the same seniority once he switched job roles, and therefore the union wouldn't let him have Saturdays off.  TWA refused a proposal wherein he would have worked only four days a week, and he was eventually discharged for refusing to work on Saturdays.

Supreme Court Decision 
The Supreme court sided with the Trans World Airlines because the Equal Employment Opportunity Commission states there needs to be “reasonable” accommodations for religious exercise.

In a widely quoted dissenting opinion, Justice Thurgood Marshall wrote "[O]ne of this Nation's pillars of strength our hospitality to religious diversity has been seriously eroded."

Challenges to the legal precedent   
 
In 2020 the Supreme Court denied cert in Patterson v. Walgreen, a case that called on the Court to reconsider TWA v. Hardison precedent. Justice Alito, joined by Justices Thomas and Gorusch, wrote a statement calling for the Hardison precedent to be reconsidered in a future appropriate case: I agree with the most important point made in that brief,namely, that we should reconsider the proposition, endorsed by the opinion in Trans World Airlines, Inc. v. Hardison, 432 U. S. 63, 84 (1977), that Title VII does not require an employer to make any accommodation for an employee's practice of religion if doing so would impose more than a de minimis burden. . . .

As the Solicitor General observes, Hardison's reading does not represent the most likely interpretation of the statutory term "undue hardship"; the parties' briefs in Hardison did not focus on the meaning of that term; no party in that case advanced the de minimis position; and the Courtdid not explain the basis for this interpretation. See Brief for United States as Amicus Curiae 19–21. I thus agreewith the Solicitor General that we should grant review in an appropriate case to consider whether Hardison's interpretation should be overruled.In 2021 the high court denied certiorari in Dalberiste v. GLE Associates, Small v. Memphis Light, Gas & Water, which would have challenged the precedent.  Judge Gorsuch and Alito wrote a dissent to the denial of certiorari.

15 members of US Congress filed an amicus brief on 26 September 2022, arguing that the standard set in Hardison for "undue hardship" was irreconciliable with the text and congressional purpose of Title VII, imploring the court to grant certiorari in Groff v. DeJoy, and overturn its erroneous precedent.

The Supreme Court discussed this case in their conference on January 13, 2023, and granted certiorari.

See also 
 Estate of Thornton v. Caldor, Inc., 1985
 Sunday closing law

References

Labour law
Trans World Airlines
Supreme Court of the United States